Borealis Planitia  is a large plain on Mercury with a smooth floor, thought to be similar to a lunar mare. It is centered at 73.4° N, 79.5° W. The name is Latin for Northern Plain.

References 

Impact craters on Mercury